Kulasingam Thileepan also spelt Dhileeban is a  Sri Lankan Tamil politician and a member of the Sri Lankan parliament from Vanni Electoral District as a member of the Eelam People’s Democratic Party.

Electoral history

References

Eelam People's Democratic Party politicians
Living people
Members of the 16th Parliament of Sri Lanka
Sri Lankan Tamil politicians
1979 births